The 2021–22 Cupa României was the 84th season of the annual Romanian primary football knockout tournament. The winner qualified for the second qualifying round of the 2022–23 UEFA Europa Conference League. Times up to 30 October 2021 and from 26 March 2022 are EEST (UTC+3). Times between 31 October 2021 and 27 March 2022 are EET (UTC+2).

Participating clubs
The following 128 teams qualified for the competition:

Round and draw dates
Source:

Preliminary rounds

The first rounds, and any preliminaries, are organised by the Regional leagues.

First round
All matches will be played on 28 July 2021.

|colspan="3" style="background-color:#97DEFF"|28 July 2021

|}

Second Round 
All matches will be played on 11 August 2021.

|colspan="3" style="background-color:#97DEFF"|11 August 2021

|}

Round of 32
The matches were played on 21, 22 and 23 September 2021.

|colspan="3" style="background-color:#97DEFF"|21 September 2021|-
|colspan="3" style="background-color:#97DEFF"|22 September 2021|-
|colspan="3" style="background-color:#97DEFF"|23 September 2021|}

Round of 16
The matches were played on 26, 27 and 28 October 2021.

|colspan="3" style="background-color:#97DEFF"|26 October 2021|-
|colspan="3" style="background-color:#97DEFF"|27 October 2021|-
|colspan="3" style="background-color:#97DEFF"|28 October 2021|}

Quarter-finals
The matches were played on 30 November, 1 and 2 December 2021.

|colspan="3" style="background-color:#97DEFF"|30 November 2021|-
|colspan="3" style="background-color:#97DEFF"|1 December 2021|-
|colspan="3" style="background-color:#97DEFF"|2 December 2021'''

|}

Semi-finals

|}

Final

References

 
Romania
Cupa României seasons